Ben Weyts (born 12 November 1970) is a Belgian politician of the New Flemish Alliance (N-VA). He has been a Vice Minister-President of Flanders in the Jambon Government since 2019, and serves as the Flemish minister for Animal Welfare, the Brussels Periphery, Education, and Sport. He previously served in the Homans and Bourgeois governments from 2014 to 2019. He was a member of the Chamber of Representatives from 2008 to 2014.

Notes

Living people
1970 births
Government ministers of Flanders
Members of the Chamber of Representatives (Belgium)
New Flemish Alliance politicians
Politicians from Leuven
Ghent University alumni
21st-century Belgian politicians
People's Union (Belgium) politicians